Audronius Ažubalis (born 17 January 1958 Vilnius, Lithuania) is a Lithuanian journalist and politician, serving as the Minister of Foreign Affairs of Lithuania from 2010 - 2012. He was a member of the Seimas 1996–2000, and was elected again in 2004. He has chaired the foreign affairs committee of the Seimas. Ažubalis represents the Homeland Union – Lithuanian Christian Democrats, Lithuania's conservative party and part of the European People's Party.

Biography 
In 1976 he graduated from Antanas Vienuolis secondary school in Vilnius and enrolled into the Vilnius University. He received a tertiary education degree in history in 1989. Later he continued his studies at the World Press Institute at Macalester College, United States.

In January 2010, Prime Minister Andrius Kubilius presented Ažubalis as a candidate for the position of Minister of Foreign Affairs to President Dalia Grybauskaitė.

Views on Stalinism
Together with five other European foreign ministers, Ažubalis has called for the criminalization of "the approval, denial or belittling of communist crimes," arguing that "everybody knows about the crimes of Nazism, but only part of Europe is aware of the crimes of communism." Ažubalis has argued that "it is not possible to find differences between Hitler and Stalin except in their moustaches," echoing the view advanced by Stéphane Courtois in The Black Book of Communism.

References

External links
 Conservatives want Ažubalis to head foreign ministry (2010-01-26 08:11 by Alfa.lt staff, Alfa.lt)

Living people
1958 births
Members of the Seimas
Ministers of Foreign Affairs of Lithuania
Journalists from Vilnius
Vilnius University alumni
Recipients of the Order of the Cross of Terra Mariana, 2nd Class
21st-century Lithuanian politicians